Sareshk or Sereshk may refer to:
 Sereshk, Isfahan
 Sareshk, Kerman
 Sareshk, Yazd